Compsolechia ocelligera is a moth of the family Gelechiidae. It was described by Arthur Gardiner Butler in 1883. It is found in Chile.

References

Moths described in 1883
Compsolechia
Endemic fauna of Chile